Ratko Kacian (18 January 1917 – 18 June 1949) was a Croatian footballer.  He played internationally for the Croatian national team from 1940 to 1943 and with Yugoslavia's national team in 1946. He was also part of Yugoslavia's squad for the football tournament at the 1948 Summer Olympics, but he did not play in any matches.

Club career
Kacian played for HAŠK, Hajduk Split before moving to Dinamo Zagreb.

International career
He made his debut for the Jozo Jakopić-led Banovina of Croatia in a December 1940 friendly match against Hungary and earned a total of 10 caps scoring no goals. He played the other 9 games under the flag of the Independent State of Croatia, a World War II-era puppet state of Nazi Germany. His only game for Yugoslavia was a May 1946 friendly away against Czechoslovakia.

Personal life

Death
He died of endocarditis in the summer of 1949.

References

External links
Profile at Serbian federation official website
 

1917 births
1949 deaths
Sportspeople from Zadar
People from the Kingdom of Dalmatia
Association football forwards
Croatian footballers
Croatia international footballers
Yugoslav footballers
Yugoslavia international footballers
Olympic footballers of Yugoslavia
Olympic silver medalists for Yugoslavia
Footballers at the 1948 Summer Olympics
Olympic medalists in football
Medalists at the 1948 Summer Olympics
Dual internationalists (football)
HAŠK players
HNK Hajduk Split players
GNK Dinamo Zagreb players
Yugoslav First League players
Deaths from endocarditis
Burials at Mirogoj Cemetery